Talkhab (also Romanized as Talkhāb and Talkh Āb) is a village in Bughda Kandi Rural District, in the Central District of Zanjan County, Zanjan Province, Iran. At the 2006 census, its population was 807, in 187 families.

References 

Populated places in Zanjan County